Roggwil is the name of two municipalities of Switzerland:

Roggwil, Bern
Roggwil, Thurgau